The European Foundation for the Improvement of Living and Working Conditions (Eurofound) is an agency of the European Union which focuses on managing research, gathering information, and communicating its findings.

It was set up in May 1975 by the European Council to help improve living and working conditions across Europe, and was one of the first bodies established to work on a specific subset of EU policy. It is headquartered in Loughlinstown, County Dublin, Ireland.

Role and mission 
The European Foundation for the Improvement of Living and Working Conditions (Eurofound) describes its role on its own information page as follows:

Organisation 
It maintains a number of specialized operations monitoring and measuring conditions in Europe, including:
 the European Observatory of Working Life (EurWORK)
 the European Monitoring Centre on Change (EMCC)
 the European Restructuring Monitor (ERM)
 Regular surveys on European working conditions, quality of life, and company policies on working time issues (the first working conditions survey was carried out in 1990):
– European Working Conditions Survey (EWCS)
– European Quality of Life Survey (EQLS)
- European Company Survey (ECS)

The offices of Eurofound are located at Loughlinstown House, Wyattville Road, Loughlinstown, Co. Dublin, D18 KP65, Ireland.

Governance 
The foundation is overseen by a Management Board, executive director, and deputy director. The Executive Board meets once a year to set budgets and policy, and to decide on one-year and four-year work programmes. The current director, Ivailo Kalfin, was appointed in June 2021. The deputy director is Maria Jepsen.

The foundation budget (21,8M euros in 2021) comes from the general European Commission budget.

References

External links 
 
 "About Eurofound", Eurofound
 "Publications", Eurofound
 "Surveys", Eurofound
 "Observatories", Eurofound

1975 in the European Economic Community
Agencies of the European Union
Government agencies established in 1975
Organisations based in Dublin (city)
International organisations based in Ireland